Pell James (born April 30, 1977) is an American actress.

Life and career
James was born in Virginia. In the early 2000s, she appeared in an episode of Law & Order and an episode of  Law & Order:SVU. In 2005, she portrayed Brier in Undiscovered. She also appeared in the film Broken Flowers and earned her first starring role in the film  The King. In 2007, she played Zodiac Killer victim Cecelia Shepard in Zodiac.

In 2006, James married banker, entertainment executive, and vice-chairman of Lionsgate Michael R. Burns in a Roman Catholic ceremony officiated by Rev. William G. Murphy at the Chateau Marmont.

Filmography

Film

Television

References

External links
 

1977 births
American film actresses
American television actresses
Living people
Actresses from Virginia
Place of birth missing (living people)
21st-century American women